is the thirteenth episode of the Japanese anime television series Neon Genesis Evangelion, which was created by Gainax. The episode, written by Hideaki Anno, Mitsuo Iso, and Akio Satsukwa and directed by Tensai Okamura, was first broadcast on TV Tokyo on December 27, 1995. The series is set fifteen years after a worldwide cataclysm known as Second Impact and is mostly set in the futuristic, fortified city of Tokyo-3. The series' protagonist is Shinji Ikari, a teenage boy who is recruited by his father Gendo to the special military organization Nerv to pilot a gigantic, bio-mechanical mecha named Evangelion into combat with beings called Angels. During the episode, a microscopic Angel called Iruel begins to penetrate Nerv headquarters, and after a quick evolutionary leap acquires the characteristics of a computer by attempting to hack into the agency's central supercomputer, the Magi System. Ritsuko Akagi, in charge of the Magi, tries to thwart his advance with a reverse hacking.

The episode, in the animation of which Production I.G. was involved, initially contained many more science fiction concepts, added at the writing stage by Mitsuo Iso. In its final version, "Lilliputian Hitcher" contains several references to biology, particularly genetics, including polysomes, the Pribnow box, the central dogma of molecular biology and the sigma factor. Its title is also a reference to the Lilliputians, the microscopic men introduced in Jonathan Swift's Gulliver's Travels.

"Lilliputian Hitcher" drew a 3.4% audience share on Japanese television. It received a generally positive reception. Reviewers praised Hacking's sense of suspense, the aesthetics of the Nerv headquarters, the focus on Ritsuko's character and the computer battle against Iruel.

Plot
Shinji Ikari, Rei Ayanami, and Asuka Langley Soryu, three pilots in charge of the Evangelion mechas, are subjected to an experiment by Dr. Ritsuko Akagi, head of the technology department of the special paramilitary agency Nerv. The three pilots are placed naked inside some pseudo Evangelions called Simulation Bodies. As the pilots undergo the test an anaerobic bacterial Angel called Iruel begins to infiltrate through the blocks in the walls of Nerv's Pribnow Box room. The pilots are ejected as an emergency from headquarters, while Nerv staff attempt to eradicate the Angel by increasing the presence of ozone in the area. Iruel, however, quickly undergoes an evolutionary transformation so fast that he acquires the characteristics of a computer, thus attempting to hack into the Magi System supercomputer, Nerv's beating heart. 

Iruel infiltrates the supercomputer and tries to induce the headquarters into self-destruct mode. Its hacking is temporarily slowed down by Ritsuko, who devises a strategy called "reverse hacking" in an attempt to defeat him, believing it is better to increase the enemy's evolution and insert a program to make Iruel choose to coexist with the Magi System. Ritsuko's program defeats Iruel, the headquarters is saved and the central computer returns to ordinary mode.

Production
In 1993, Gainax published a presentation document for Neon Genesis Evangelion entitled , containing the initial synopsis for the planned episodes. For the first twelve episodes aired, the company roughly followed the schedule envisioned by the "Proposal," with only a few minor script differences. From the thirteenth episode onward, however, the production deviated from the original plan of the writers and from what was initially envisioned in the submission document. The thirteenth episode of the series was to be titled ; during the installment Shinji would be defeated in combat and trapped inside an Angel, beginning a trilogy of episodes with the same basic theme. The staff in progress abandoned the original project, and some of the ideas for the trilogy were later transferred and condensed into the sixteenth episode. According to Michael House, translator at the time for Gainax, the phrase "The end point of evolution is death," uttered by Gendo during "Lilliputian Hitcher," represents a watershed within the series' production. Neon Genesis Evangelion main director Hideaki Anno in the making initially intended to give the story a happy ending, but during production he realized that he had created characters that were too problematic, so he changed his plans. According to Hiroki Azuma, a culture critic who personally interviewed the director, Anno during the airing of the series began to criticize otaku, whom he considered too closed-minded and introverted, so he changed his original plans by creating a more dramatic and introspective story toward the middle of the series.

Mitsuo Iso, Akio Satsukawa, and Anno wrote the script; Tensai Okamura handled the storyboards and served as director, while Masahiko Otsuka worked as assistant director. Kazuya Kise took the role as a chief animator, and worked with Ise as assistant character designer. Mitsuo Iso originally joined the project as an animator, but he actively entered other jobs by freely coming up with various ideas and writing about them to the director every day. Iso initially wrote a very long original script full of science fiction concepts, but Akio Satsukawa had to rework it and remove some concepts. Only later did Anno take over, who made other changes before drafting the final script. The ending of the final draft was a little disappointing for Iso, because it was forcibly connected to a plot that he had planned to use in another episode.

Yūichirō Oguro, the editor of supplemental materials included in the Japanese edition of the series, noted how Kise has a particular style with respect to the graphical rendering of characters' faces, as he adds detailed shadows and tries to make the characters' bone structure evident. For his work as an animator, Kise was also particularly inspired by the manga version of Yoshiyuki Sadamoto, the character designer of the series, giving a different interpretation of Sadamoto's directives than the other animation directors of the anime. Evangelion Chronicle magazine, on the other hand, noted how Okamura, in charge of producing the storyboards, blends science fiction and human drama into his works.

The production of "Lilliputian Hitcher" involved other companies outside Gainax, including Studio Deen, Tezuka Productions, and Production I.G. At first, Production I.G. was supposed to produce the whole anime, and the company president, Mitsuhisa Ishikawa, was willing to do so; for various reasons, including Mamoru Oshii's apparent refusal, the original plans were changed, so Production I.G. only took care of "Lilliputian Hitcher" and other individual episodes. The crew made extensive use of computer graphics throughout Evangelion, but they were all processed in a flat two-dimensional manner, as in the case of computer screens. The CGI was used as raw material for the final drawings produced by traditional manual methods, so as to create images that were more accurate than the average level at the time. The staff therefore, although the use of computer graphics was difficult and expensive for television animation, made new attempts with technology and experimented with solutions that were innovative during the first Evangelion broadcast. The computer-scanned images of the Evangelion pilots' bodies, for example, were retouched with a Macintosh computer by a section of Gainax called Gainax Shop. To draw the Nerv's bridge instead, Gainax through a company called General Products made thirty-centimetre paper models and shot them from various angles to represent it more realistically. For the appearance of the command centre, the staff also took inspiration from the decks of battleships. Koichi Yamadera, Koichi Nagano, Megumi Ogata, Fujiko Takimoto and Megumi Hayashibara played the announcers udible on the command center for "Lilliputian Hitcher". Yoko Takahashi, who had already sung the opening theme song, also sang an "Acid Bossa" version of "Fly Me to the Moon" which was later used as the episode's closing theme song.

Cultural references and themes
Evangelion Chronicle magazine identified several references to biology in "Lilliputian Hitcher", particularly genetics, although these take on a different meaning than real-world biology. In one scene, machines called Polysomes, named after the polysomes of the same name in molecular biology, are presented. The room in which the initial Nerv test is carried out is called the Pribnow Box, also a reference to the biological concept of the same name. Other references include the Central Dogma, whose name is taken from the central dogma of molecular biology, and the Sigma Unit, whose name refers to the sigma factor, a factor in the initiation of RNA synthesis. Evangelion Chronicle also likened Iruel's properties, such as self-replication, data processing, and colony self-regulation, to micromachines and K. Eric Drexler's universal molecular assembler. Ritsuko's strategy to annihilate Iruel, in which the Angel is induced to choose coexistence with the Magi System and annihilate itself, has instead been compared to apoptosis. Co-existence with the Magi System, on the other hand, has been likened to a situation of biological symbiosis.

According to the Evangelion Encyclopedia, published along with the Italian Platinum Edition of the series, the staff wanted Iruel to suggest an answer to the debate between evolutionism and creationism. The title of the episode is a reference to Iruel and the Lilliputians, a race of tiny men mentioned in Jonathan Swift's Gulliver's Travels. The names of the three Magi constitute a reference to the three wise men from the East mentioned in Matthew's Gospel, whom tradition indicates as Balthasar, Gaspar, and Melchior. "Lilliputian Hitcher" through the operation of the Magi also deepens the mother-daughter relationship between Ritsuko and Naoko, whose personalities are imprinted in the supercomputers. Academician Mariana Ortega noted how Ritsuko enters the Magi System in the course of the operation just as Evangelion's pilots enter the mechas, inside of which the souls of their mothers are stored. Ortega therefore described the mother figure in Evangelion as metaphorically and literally "cannibalistic". Writer Dennis Redmond described the three Magi computers and the three aspects of Naoko's personality as a "clever gender bend" of the patriarchal trinity of the Father, the Son, and Holy Ghost. He also traced the themes of "Lilliputian Hitcher" to influences of William Gibson's Neuromancer, speculating that Naoko herself is based on Neuromancer Marie Tessier-Ashpool.

Reception
"Lilliputian Hitcher" was first broadcast on December 27, 1995, and drew a 3.4% audience share on Japanese television. Merchandise on the episode has also been released. The installment received a positive reception from anime critics and reviewers. The Anime Café's Akio Nagatomi, while finding the "human interest" of the episode "simplistic and contrived", praised the sense of suspense, saying, "Very clever and fast-paced direction keep the tension levels high, in what I believe is the best episode yet". Writer Dennis Redmond positively commented the "extraordinary aesthetic beauty of Nerv's instrument panels". Film School Rejects' Max Covill similarly lauded "Lilliputian Hitcher" as a "great episode", especially for the "interesting" focus on Ritsuko's character. Writer Dani Cavallaro described Iruel as the "most formidable menace" presented by the series, while SyFy Wire website's Daniel Dockery cited the battle against the Angel among the show's best "non-depressing" moments. Comic Book Resources' Ajay Aravind also praised the computer battle against Iruel, ranking it as the second best fight in Neon Genesis Evangelion.

References

Citations

Bibliography

External links
 

1995 Japanese television episodes
Neon Genesis Evangelion episodes
Science fiction television episodes